Ratbag Games Pty Ltd was an Australian developer of video games such as Powerslide, The Dukes of Hazzard: Return of the General Lee and World of Outlaws: Sprint Cars 2002.

History 
Ratbag was founded in 1993 in Adelaide, South Australia, by Richard Harrison and Greg Siegele. Known initially as "Emergent Games", the company took three years to prototype their first title Powerslide. Following its acquisition by Midway Games on 4 August 2005, the company was known as "Midway Studios - Australia". On 13 December 2005, employees at the studio were told that Ratbag was going to be closed by its parent company. Two days later, on the 15th, the studio was closed, leaving the staff there without jobs. Subsequently, Krome Studios rehired many of the Ratbag staff and established Krome Studios Adelaide.

Games 
Ratbag made a name for itself with its debut title Powerslide. The arcade racer, set in a post-apocalyptic future, is powered by a highly advanced rendering system for its time, allowing for up to 300,000 polygons on-screen at once. Powerslide was met with critical if not commercial success, receiving a lot of publicity from the Australian gaming media. Several PC racing titles followed over the years, and before too long Ratbag found itself "typecast" as a simulation racing developer.

With the arrival of the PlayStation 2 in late 2000, Ratbag saw an opportunity to move into the lucrative console market. World of Outlaws: Sprint Cars 2002 was the first of several PlayStation 2 titles developed and released, with a handful of titles going unpublished, most notably the follow-up to Powerslide, Powerslide: Slipstream.

The last title developed by Ratbag (prior to their acquisition) was The Dukes of Hazzard: Return of the General Lee for the PlayStation 2 and the Xbox. The "Adventure/Racing" title was the first Ratbag title to break from the simulation tradition set forth by previous titles and features simple "on-foot" gameplay in addition to various story-driven racing missions. Coming after a wave of similar mission-based driving games and with a rushed development, The Dukes of Hazzard: Return of the General Lee received a lukewarm response from the gaming press.

List 
 Powerslide – Windows
 Dirt Track Racing – Windows
 Dirt Track Racing: Sprint Cars – Windows
 Dirt Track Racing 2 – Windows
 Leadfoot – Windows
 Dirt Track Racing: Australia – Windows
 World of Outlaws: Sprint Cars 2002 – PS2, Windows
 Saturday Night Speedway – PS2, Windows
 The Dukes of Hazzard: Return of the General Lee – PS2, Xbox

See also
 Greg Siegele

References

External links
 Ratbag Games Last version of Ratbag Games official website reproduced by Australian video game website  Sumea for archive purposes.
 Midway shafts Ratbag Studios Employee's account of company closure

Midway Games
Defunct video game companies of Australia
Video game companies established in 1993
Video game companies disestablished in 2005
Video game development companies